Andrew Jones is an American politician. He serves as a Republican member of the Alabama Senate for the 10th District.

References 

Republican Party Alabama state senators
21st-century American politicians
Year of birth missing (living people)
Living people